{{DISPLAYTITLE:321 Days in Michigan}}321 Days in Michigan is a 2014 Spanish tragicomedy prison film directed by Enrique García, winner of best director in a debut film at the Premios Asecan del Cine Andaluz. It won the Audience Award at the 17th Málaga Film Festival.

Synopsis
Filmed at the former provincial jail of Málaga, it is the story of Antonio Chico García, a young and successful executive, condemned to go to prison because of white collar crimes. In order to hide this fact, he pretends he is spending time at the University of Michigan working on a master's degree. His girlfriend Lola agrees to help him by uploading pictures to a blog about his fictional life there. The film deals with his life in prison and his relationships with fellow inmates.

Cast

 Production 
The films is a Lanube Películas and Encanta Films production. It was shot in Málaga featuring a cast primarily consisting of actors from Málaga.

 Release 
The film premiered at the 17th Málaga Film Festival in March 2014. Distributed by Cada Films, it opened in Spanish theatres on 31 October 2014, the same day as its scheduled television premiere on Canal Plus. 

Critical reception
Despite the omnipresence of Antonio throughout the film, some critics consider that this is really the story of Sara, (Virginia De Morata). The Videodromo film critic Aitziber Saldias states "...this is Sara's film, Sara's story. She catches all the attention by just moving in the background..." De Morata won best supporting actress (Premios Asecan).

In his review for El Mundo, Cristóbal C. Monilla notes that  prison is seen as a place where people are more "burdened by their internal condemnation dictated by life itself than by the physical confinement behind bars."

The Fotogramas'' critic, Mirito Torreiro, considers that "its authenticy, dynamism, the humanity that comes from its actors." constitutes the film best qualities. "So much so as to [make us] forgive its faults..."

Awards

 XVII Festival del Cine Español de Málaga - Two awards:  321 days in Michigan: special award by the jury. Best supporting actor: Héctor Meres (321 días en Michigan).
 2015 Premios Asecan del Cine Andaluz - Two awards: Best actress: Virginia de Morata (321 días en Michigan). Best debuting director: Enrique García (321 días en Michigan).

See also 
 List of Spanish films of 2014

References

External links
 

Spanish comedy-drama films
2014 films
2010s Spanish-language films
Films scored by Fernando Velázquez
Films shot in the province of Málaga
2010s Spanish films
Spanish prison films
2010s prison films